José González (19 March 1925 – 3 October 2016) was a Puerto Rican sports shooter. He competed in the 50 metre pistol event at the 1968 Summer Olympics.

References

1925 births
2016 deaths
Puerto Rican male sport shooters
Olympic shooters of Puerto Rico
Shooters at the 1968 Summer Olympics
People from Cayey, Puerto Rico